Tapura ivorensis is a species of plant in the Dichapetalaceae family. It is found in Ivory Coast and Ghana. It is threatened by habitat loss.

References

Vulnerable plants
ivorensis
Taxonomy articles created by Polbot